"Desire" is a song by Swedish singer Darin. It was released as the third single from Darin's third studio album Break the News in Sweden on 7 May 2007. In Germany, the song released as the album's second single on 7 December 2007.

Formats and track listings
Digital download (iTunes)
"Desire" – 3:07

Enhanced CD maxi single
"Desire" – 3:07
"Desire" (Radio Edit) – 3:07
"Desire" (Instrumental) – 3:07
"What If I Kissed You Now" – 3:27
Bonus Videos
"Desire" – 3:09
"Desire" (Live in Cologne 25/09/2007) – 3:40

Charts

References

2006 songs
2007 singles
Darin (singer) songs
Electropop songs
Songs written by Patric Sarin
Sony BMG singles
Songs written by Darin (singer)
Songs written by Peter Mansson